Suriyan Sor Rungvisai (born Suriyan Kaiganha, March 2, 1989) is a Thai professional boxer in the super flyweight division. He is the former WBC super flyweight champion. and the older brother of flyweight contender Nawaphon Sor Rungvisai.

Early life and career
Suriyan started his career in Muay Thai at the age of seven. He made his professional boxing debut at the age of 16, beating Yoddoi Sithsoei by decision. Early in his career, he fought for several regional titles, winning the WBO Asia Pacific Youth Light Flyweight Title, and the WBC Asian Boxing Council Flyweight Title, twice. Notable fights, during this time, include a points decision victory against future WBA super flyweight champion Tepparith Singwancha.

He is part of Nakhornluang Boxing Promotions under Suchart Pisitwuttinan, the manager of two former WBC world champions (Veeraphol "Death Mask" Sahaprom and Sirimongkol Singwangcha).

On October 18, 2010, he got his first world title shot against the Thai WBC, lineal, and The Ring flyweight world champion Pongsaklek Wonjongkam. The fight was competitive; Rungvisai used his superior speed to trouble the more experienced Wonjongjongkam, winning some of the early and middle rounds, but lost a point in the eight round for an unintentional clash of heads. Wonjongkam was able to close the fight stronger against Rungvisai, winning by a very close unanimous decision. The judges had the fight 115-114, 115-112, 114-113, all for Wonjongkam.

On August 19, 2011, he successfully dethroned Mexican Tomas Rojas with a unanimous decision victory, to capture WBC super flyweight title at Srisaket, Thailand. Despite giving up 5 inches in height to Rojas, Rungvisai is 5'3 and Rojas is 5'8, Rungvisai was able to use his superior speed to land combinations, to win many of the early and middle rounds. Rojas however was able to win the later rounds through increased activity and inside fighting. Rungvisai won by unanimous decision, the judges had the fight 115-114, 116-112 and 117-111, all for Suriyan Sor Rungvisai, becoming the 43rd Thai fighter to gain a major world boxing title.

Rungvisai won his first title defense against, former two-time WBA super flyweight champion Nobuo Nashiro of Japan, winning a unanimous decision, with scores of 115-113, 119-109, and 116-113.

On March 27, 2012, he lost his title to Yota "Magic Box" Sato in Tokyo, Japan.

On October 22, 2014, he lost to Shinsuke Yamanaka for  WBC bantamweight class at Yoyogi National Gymnasium, Tokyo, Japan, losing with a unanimous decision, with scores of 114-110, 116-108, and 115-109.

On April 30, 2016, he lost to Anselmo "Chemito" Moreno for silver belt champion at WBC bantamweight class in Panama City.

Professional boxing record

Other names
Suriyan Por Chokchai (สุริยัน ป.โชคชัย)
Suriyan Nakhornluang Promotion (สุริยัน นครหลวงโปรโมชั่น)
Saensaknoi Or Muang Klaeng (แสนศักดิ์น้อย อ.เมืองแกลง)

See also
List of world super-flyweight boxing champions

References

External links

 

1989 births
Living people
Suriyan Sor Rungvisai
Suriyan Sor Rungvisai
Flyweight boxers
Super-flyweight boxers
Bantamweight boxers
World super-flyweight boxing champions
World Boxing Council champions